Karen Louise Rolton (born 21 November 1974) is an Australian former cricketer and captain of the national women's team. A left-handed batter, she has scored the most runs for her country in women's Test cricket.

International cricket
After making her international debut in 1995, Rolton went on to become a member of two successful world championship campaigns. In the final of the 2005 Women's Cricket World Cup, she scored 107 not out and was adjudged Player of the Match. Her numerous individual honours include being named ICC Women's Cricketer of the Year in 2006 and winning the Belinda Clark Award four times. New Zealand coach Steve Jenkin once remarked that the best tactic against her was to avoid dismissing the Australian team's openers so she could not bat.

In 2006, Rolton became the captain of the national team, taking over from Belinda Clark. She led Australia in the 2009 Women's Cricket World Cup on home soil, although the team performed below expectations and finished in fourth place.

Records and statistics
Across 14 Test matches, Rolton scored 1,002 runs at an average of 55.66 which included two centuries and five half-centuries. She made her top score of 209 not out against England at Headingley in 2001, a world record at the time. She also scored 4,814 runs at 48.14 in Women's One Day Internationals. Rolton became the first player to score a century in the knockout stage of a Women's Cricket World Cup and set a record for the highest individual score on debut in Women's Twenty20 Internationals with 96 not out. In addition to her batting prowess, she enjoyed success as a left-arm medium-pace bowler, taking 102 international wickets across all three formats.

International centuries

Test centuries

One Day International centuries

Retirement and post-career
In January 2010, Rolton announced her retirement from international cricket after a 14-year career. She continued to play domestic cricket for South Australia until the end of the 2010–11 Women's National Cricket League season.

In 2016, Rolton was inducted into the ICC Cricket Hall of Fame. In January 2018, she was inducted into the Australian Cricket Hall of Fame. A few months later, the South Australian Cricket Association unveiled a new community sporting facility in Adelaide, announcing the name of the main ground as Karen Rolton Oval.

Rolton currently lives in Victoria and remains involved with cricket through her coaching roles at the Melbourne Renegades and also at local level.

Honours

Team 
2x Women's Cricket World Cup champion: 1997, 2005

Individual 
 ICC Women's Cricketer of the Year: 2006
 Women's Cricket World Cup Player of the Tournament: 2005
 Women's Cricket World Cup Player of the Final: 2005
 4x Belinda Clark Award winner: 2002, 2003, 2005, 2006
 Sport Australia Hall of Fame inductee: 2021

References

Notes

Further reading

External links
 
 
 
 Karen Rolton at southernstars.org.au (archived)

1974 births
Australia women One Day International cricketers
Australia women Test cricketers
Australia women Twenty20 International cricketers
Australian Cricket Hall of Fame inductees
Cricketers from South Australia
Living people
South Australian Scorpions cricketers
Cricketers from Adelaide
Sport Australia Hall of Fame inductees
International Cricket Council Cricketer of the Year